RAAF Base Darwin  is a Royal Australian Air Force (RAAF) military air base located in the city of Darwin, in the Northern Territory, Australia. The base shares its runway with Darwin International Airport, for civil aviation purposes. The heritage-listed RAAF Base Darwin is a forward operating base with year-round activity with approximately 400 personnel.

History
Construction of the airfield began in 1938 and RAAF Station Darwin was established on 1 June 1940, from elements of No. 12 Squadron RAAF. No. 13 Squadron RAAF was also created at the same time and was based at the base. Charles Eaton was the first Commanding Officer between 1940 and 1941. No. 12 Squadron RAAF relocated from Parap Airfield, Northern Territory in April 1941 to RAAF Station Darwin. The base hosted a large number of RAAF and United States Army Air Forces (USAAF) units during World War II. The base was bombed by Japanese forces many times, beginning with two major air raids on 19 February 1942.

Parts of the  site are listed on the Commonwealth Heritage List, since 2004, with the citation stating:

The heritage items include several timber-framed and fibrous-cement clad houses, the timber-framed Sergeants Mess and Single Officer's Mess, the former Airmen's Mess, the Administrative Building, the Gymnasium and Canteen building, the Commanding Officers' Residence, the non-denominational chapel, the water tower, Guard House, the timber-framed School of Instruction, and various other residential quarters.

Units based at RAAF Darwin during World War II

No. 12 Squadron RAAF
No. 13 Squadron RAAF
No. 34 Squadron RAAF

During World War II RAAF Base Darwin served as a first refuge for retreating USAAF units from the Philippines in 1941. The USAAF Far East Air Force and its subordinate commands, V Fighter and V Bomber established headquarters at Darwin in late December 1941. Later, the USAAF 49th Fighter Group and other units were assigned to Darwin before moving north to forward bases in 1943. From 9 August 1944 to 20 February 1945 the USAAF 380th Bombardment Group based four squadrons of long-range B-24 Liberator bombers at the base. From Darwin, the group received a Distinguished Unit Citation for a series of long-range attacks on oil refineries, shipping, and dock facilities in Balikpapan, Borneo, in August 1943. The unit repeatedly bombed enemy airfields in western New Guinea during April and May 1944 in support of American landings in the Hollandia area, being awarded another DUC for this action. Moved in February 1945 to Mindoro in the Philippines.

In 1975, during the aftermath of Cyclone Tracy, the base was the centre of the largest airlift in Australian history in which the majority of Darwin's inhabitants were evacuated.

The base was an emergency landing site for the NASA Space Shuttle due to the length of its runway. United States Air Force (USAF) B-1 Lancer and B-52 Stratofortress bombers, as well as KC-10 and KC-135 tankers can operate from RAAF Base Darwin.

In 2010 it was reported that some houses near the base required extra sound proofing to deal with the extreme sound levels of the low observable Joint Strike Fighter.

Current units

Gallery

See also
 United States Army Air Forces in Australia (World War II)
 List of airports in the Northern Territory
 List of Royal Australian Air Force installations
 Marine Rotational Force - Darwin

References

External links

RAAF Museum website  Darwin Base
OzatWar website  RAAF Darwin Airfield

Buildings and structures in Darwin, Northern Territory
Royal Australian Air Force bases
Airfields of the United States Army Air Forces in Australia
Airports in the Northern Territory
1940 establishments in Australia
Military airbases established in 1940
Commonwealth Heritage List places in the Northern Territory
Military installations in the Northern Territory

ja:ダーウィン国際空港